Hystoe or Hystoë was a town of ancient Crete, which the Scholiast on Aratus connects with the Idaean nymph Cynosura, one of the nurses of Zeus.

Its site is unlocated.

References

Populated places in ancient Crete
Lost ancient cities and towns